= DUXAP9 =

Pseudogene in the species Homo sapiens

Identifiers
- Aliases: DUXAP9, double homeobox A pseudogene 9, LINC01296
- External IDs: GeneCards: DUXAP9; OMA:DUXAP9 - orthologs
Orthologs
Species	Human	Mouse
Entrez	503638	n/a
Ensembl	ENSG00000225210	n/a
UniProt	n a	n/a
RefSeq (mRNA)	n/a	n/a
RefSeq (protein)	n/a	n/a
Location (UCSC)	n/a	n/a
PubMed search		n/a
- Wikidata
View/Edit Human

Double homeobox A pseudogene 9 is a protein that in humans is encoded by the DUXAP9 gene.
